Gino Valori (1890–1961) was an Italian screenwriter and film director. He directed the 1939 film Equatore (1939).

Selected filmography

Screenwriter
 The White Squadron (1936)
 The Phantom Gondola (1936)

Director
 Equatore (1939)
 Who Are You? (1939)

References

Bibliography 
 Goble, Alan. The Complete Index to Literary Sources in Film. Walter de Gruyter, 1999.

External links 
 

1890 births
1961 deaths
20th-century Italian screenwriters
Italian male screenwriters
Italian film directors
Film people from Florence
20th-century Italian male writers